Shamosuchus is an extinct genus of neosuchian crocodyliform that lived during the Late Cretaceous (Campanian) period in what is now the Djadokhta Formation of Mongolia, approximately 75 million to 71 million years ago.

Paleobiology
 
The eye and nasal openings were not raised above the skull as in modern crocodilians, so that the animal would have to raise its head completely out of the water to breathe. As this cranial morphology does not suit an ambush predator, it lends support to the idea of a diet of aquatic invertebrates. The teeth were adapted to crush bivalves, gastropods and other animals with a shell or exoskeleton. The genus was named in 1924 by Charles C. Mook.

Paralligator was synonymized with Shamosuchus by several authors. However, recent cladistic analysis of Paralligatoridae found Paralligator distinct from Shamosuchus.

References

External links
CRETÁCEO répteis e anfíbios
Forum on ancient species K-T crocodylians

Late Cretaceous crocodylomorphs of Asia
Neosuchians
Prehistoric pseudosuchian genera
Fossil taxa described in 1924